Supercub was a male lion that was adopted as a cub from the Nairobi National Park Orphanage near Nairobi, Kenya. In 1972, Supercub was a pride member with Christian the lion and other lions being cared for by conservationist George Adamson in the Kora National Reserve in Kenya. The lion, whose personality was described as "boisterous" and "extroverted", was dubbed Supercub by Adamson.

Supercub is briefly seen in the uncut ending of the 1972 documentary film The Lion at World's End. At the time of the scene Supercub was five months old.

In 1972, Supercub was killed by a wild lion known as "The Killer". The cub is buried in the Kora National Reserve beside  the graves of George Adamson, Terrance Adamson and two lions released after George's death named Mugi and Boy.

References

Sources

External links
 George Adamson website

Individual lions
Lions and humans
1972 animal deaths
Individual animals in Kenya